Baby ouh is Stereo Total's 10th album. It was released on March 26 in Europe (Disko B) and on 4 May 2010 in the USA (Kill Rock Stars).

Track listing 

 Hallo Damenklo - 2:19 (The US edition includes an English version of «Hallo Damenklo» called «Hello Ladies»)
 Alaska - 2:46
 Divine's Handbag - 2:27
 Andy Warhol - 3:37
 Barbe à Papa - 3:01 (cover of the Brigitte Fontaine song)
 No Controles - 2:36 (cover of the Ole Ole song)
 Du Bist Gut Zu Vögeln - 2:52
 I Wanna Be a Mama - 2:32 (cover of the Almodovar and McNamara's song)
 Babyboom Ohne Mich - 2:04
 Lady Dandy - 2:24
 Illégal - 2:54 (cover of the Corbeau song)
 Wenn Ich ein Junge Wär - 1:52
 Tour de France - 2:48
 Larmes de Métal - 2:33 (cover of the Soupir song)
 Elles Te Bottent, Mes Bottes? - 2:36
 Baby Ouh - 5:07
 Radio Song - 3:27 (The US edition includes «Violent Love» instead of «Radio Song»)

References 

2010 albums
Stereo Total albums